Boris Yuryevich Titov (born 24 December 1960, Moscow, USSR) is a Russian politician and businessman serving as the presidential commissioner for entrepreneurs' rights since 2012. He has led the Party of Growth, previously known as Right Cause, since February 2016. 

In the 2018 presidential election, Titov ran as a candidate, finishing sixth place with 0.76% of the vote.

Life and career

Boris Titov was born in Moscow on Christmas Eve, 1960. In 1983, he graduated from the Department of Economics at the Moscow State Institute of International Relations.

Business

In 1989, Titov resigned from a state-owned company and was appointed Head of the Department of Chemistry of the joint Soviet-Dutch enterprise Urals. In 1991, he and his partners created their own company, Solvalub. They bought London-based solvents and lubricants, with which they collaborated for a project involving Urals and the VO Soviet Oil Export. He became executive director of the SVL Group companies.  He was also mentioned in the mainstream media as the chairman of the board of the group. Later, the company turned into an investment and trading group, operating in the oil market, agro- and petrochemicals, and liquefied gases. The company very quickly became involved in refinancing exports from Russia, the organization of project financing, and investments in production and transportation projects. Titov, who is the majority owner of Solvalub, was valued at $2 billion in 2008.

26 June 2012, the board of directors of Abrau-Durso, a winery owned by Titov, voted to terminate Titov's authority as the director of the company, in connection with his transfer to the civil service and election to the board of directors.

Social activity

In 2000, he was elected to be a member of the board and vice-president of the Russian Union of Industrialists and Entrepreneurs.

In 2003, he became co-chair, and in May 2004, the chairman of the all-Russian Business Russia public organization. In this capacity, he criticized the rigid financial policies of the Minister of Finance Alexei Kudrin. He insisted on the need to increase domestic production of goods, stimulate demand, attract investments, and change tax cuts and the refinancing rate of the Central Bank.

As the leader of Business Russia, Boris Titov became a member of a number of state and public structures. He became a member of the Council for Implementation of Priority National Projects and Demographic Policy and Promotion of Civil Society Institutions and Human Rights Council under the President of the Russian Federation, a member of the Council on Competitiveness and Entrepreneurship at the Russian government and the government Commission on the Development of Industry, Technology and Transport. He served as chairman of the Russian side of the Russian-Chinese Business Council, chairman of the non-commercial partnership Gas Market Coordinator and member of the Presidium of the National Council on Corporate Governance.

In 2005–2008, Titov was a member of the Civic Chamber of the Russian Federation.

Political activity

In October 2007, he was elected a member of the Supreme Council of United Russia.

In 2008, he headed the Supreme Council of the party Civilian Power and began to create a new right-wing party in Russia. In November of the same year, the Democratic Party of Russia, Civilian Power, and the Union of Right Forces were disbanded and founded a new party Right Cause. Congress approved its three co-chairs. They were the former deputy chairman of the Union of Right Forces Leonid Gozman, a journalist Georgy Bovt, and Titov. A few days later, the decision of X Congress of United Russia was to prematurely terminate Titov's powers as a member of the Supreme Council of the party.
  
On 22 June 2012, a decree by the Russian President Vladimir Putin authorized Titov to protect the rights of entrepreneurs under the President of Russia.

On 29 February 2016, at the VII Congress of the Right Cause party, he was elected its chairman, saying the change of political course of the party, at the "party business" and its re-branding.

2018 presidential campaign

On 26 November 2017, Boris Titov announced his intention to run for president in the 2018 election.

Titov was officially nominated by his party on 21 December. He submitted the documents required for registration to the CEC the next day. Titov’s documents were approved by the CEC on 25 December, which meant that he could begin collecting signatures. A party spokesman commented that the collection of signatures in support of Titov would begin early in January 2018.

According to Titov, the main purpose of his participation in the election was to promote the party's Growth Strategy economic program, which was prepared by the Stolypin Club and presented to President Vladimir Putin in May 2017. During the campaign Titov and his team intend to travel around the country to promote the program.

References

1960 births
Living people
Politicians from Moscow
Businesspeople from Moscow
Russian billionaires
Civic Platform (Russia) politicians
21st-century Russian politicians
Moscow State Institute of International Relations alumni
Candidates in the 2018 Russian presidential election
Ombudsmen in Russia